This is a list of bridges and tunnels on the National Register of Historic Places in the U.S. state of North Carolina.

References

 
North Carolina
Bridges
Bridges